Roberto Codromaz (born 14 October 1995) is an Italian professional footballer who plays as a centre back for Serie D club Cjarlins Muzane.

Club career
On 17 January 2022, he joined Teramo on loan.

On 15 July 2022, Codromaz moved to Cjarlins Muzane in Serie D.

References

External links
 
 

1995 births
Living people
Footballers from Trieste
Italian footballers
Association football defenders
Serie C players
Serie D players
Udinese Calcio players
FeralpiSalò players
U.S. Triestina Calcio 1918 players
Rimini F.C. 1912 players
S.S. Juve Stabia players
Ravenna F.C. players
Piacenza Calcio 1919 players
S.S. Teramo Calcio players
A.S.D. Cjarlins Muzane players